Michel Rousseau (born 8 June 1949) is a retired French freestyle swimmer who won the 100 m event at the 1970 European Championships and placed second at the 1973 World Championships. He competed at the 1968, 1972 and 1976 Summer Olympics in eight events in total with the best result of fifth place in the 4 × 200 m freestyle relay in 1972. His daughter Magali Rousseau became an Olympic butterfly swimmer.

References

1949 births
Living people
French male freestyle swimmers
Olympic swimmers of France
Swimmers at the 1968 Summer Olympics
Swimmers at the 1972 Summer Olympics
Swimmers at the 1976 Summer Olympics
World Aquatics Championships medalists in swimming
European Aquatics Championships medalists in swimming